Ornithinicoccus is a Gram-positive and non-motile bacterial genus from the family of Intrasporangiaceae.

References

Intrasporangiaceae
Bacteria genera